Elisi Busco Vunipola (born 5 July 1972, in Nuku'alofa) is a Tongan former rugby union player. He played as fly-half.

Career
Vunipola debuted for Tonga in the match against Fiji, in Nuku'alofa, on 24 March 1990. He played the 1995 and 1999 World Cups, earning in total 6 World Cup caps. Although not taking part at the 2003 Rugby World Cup, Vunipola last played for Tonga in the match against France, in Toulouse, on 19 November 2005. At club level, he played for Sanyo, ACT Brumbies, Caerphilly RFC and Bay of Plenty.

Personal life
He is brother of the scrum-half Manu Vunipola and of the hooker Feʻao Vunipola, both Tongan internationals. He is also the uncle of Feʻao's sons, Billy and Mako Vunipola, both England internationals. He is the father of fly-half Manu Vunipola.

Notes

External links

1972 births
Living people
Tongan rugby union players
Saitama Wild Knights players
Tongan expatriate sportspeople in Australia
Tongan expatriate sportspeople in Wales
Tongan expatriate sportspeople in Japan
Tongan expatriate sportspeople in New Zealand
Rugby union fly-halves
Tonga international rugby union players
People from Nukuʻalofa
Tongan expatriate rugby union players
Expatriate rugby union players in Australia
Expatriate rugby union players in Wales
Expatriate rugby union players in Japan
Expatriate rugby union players in New Zealand